Woonona railway station is located on the South Coast railway line in New South Wales, Australia, serving the northern Wollongong suburb of Woonona. It opened on 25 August 1919.

Platforms & services
Woonona has two side platforms and is serviced by NSW TrainLink South Coast line services travelling from Waterfall and Thirroul to Port Kembla. Some peak hour and late night services operate to Sydney Central, Bondi Junction and Kiama.

Transport links
Dion's Bus Service operate two routes via Woonona station:
92: Bulli to Wollongong
93: Bulli to University of Wollongong

References

External links

Woonona station details Transport for New South Wales

Buildings and structures in Wollongong
Easy Access railway stations in New South Wales
Railway stations in Australia opened in 1919
Regional railway stations in New South Wales